Federico Serrano (born 28 September 1944) is a Mexican equestrian. He competed in the individual dressage event at the 1968 Summer Olympics.

References

1944 births
Living people
Mexican male equestrians
Mexican dressage riders
Olympic equestrians of Mexico
Equestrians at the 1968 Summer Olympics
Sportspeople from Mexico City